A census agglomeration is a census geographic unit in Canada determined by Statistics Canada. A census agglomeration comprises one or more adjacent census subdivisions that has a core population of 10,000 or greater. It is eligible for classification as a census metropolitan area once it reaches a population of 100,000.

At the 2016 Census, the Province of Alberta had 15 census agglomerations, down from 16 in the 2011 Census. At the 2011 Census, the Province of Alberta had 16 census agglomerations, up from 14 in the 2006 Census. 

The former CA of Lethbridge was promoted to a census metropolitan area in 2016.

List 
The following is a list of the census agglomerations within Alberta.

See also 
Census geographic units of Canada
List of Canadian census agglomerations by province or territory
List of census agglomerations in Canada
List of designated places in Alberta
List of municipalities in Alberta
List of population centres in Alberta

References

External links 
Statistics Canada – Census

Census agglomerations